Events in the year 1932 in Brazil.

Incumbents

Federal government 
 President: Getúlio Vargas (Head of the Provisional Government)
 Vice President: none

Governors 
 Alagoas: Tasso de Oliveira Tinoco; Louis de France Albuquerque
 Amazonas: Álvaro Botelho Maia
 Bahia: Juracy Magalhães
 Ceará: Manuel Fernandes Távora
 Goiás:
 till 3 November: Pedro Ludovico Teixeira
 3 November - 20 December: Mário de Alencastro Caiado
 from 20 December: Pedro Ludovico Teixeira
 Maranhão: Lourival Seroa da Mota
 Mato Grosso: Artur Antunes Maciel; Leônidas Antero de Matos
 Minas Gerais: Olegário Dias Maciel
 Pará: Joaquim de Magalhães Barata
 Paraíba: 
 till 26 April: Antenor de França Navarro
 from 26 April: Gratuliano da Costa Brito
 Pernambuco: Carlos de Lima Cavalcanti
 Piauí: Landry Sales
 Paraná: 
 João Perneta
 Manuel Ribas
 Rio Grande do Norte: Hercolino Cascardo (until June 11, 1932); Bertino Dutra da Silva (from June 11, 1932)
 Rio Grande do Sul: José Antônio Flores da Cunha
 Santa Catarina:
 São Paulo: Manuel Rabelo (until March 7, 1932); Pedro Manuel de Toledo (from July 10, 1932)
 Sergipe:

Vice governors 
 Rio Grande do Norte:
 São Paulo:

Events 

24 February – The Justiça Eleitoral do Brasil is created by Decreto nº 21.076.
April – Peter Fleming joins the expedition to find missing Englishman Colonel Percy Fawcett; the following year he publishes an account of the expedition, entitled Brazilian Adventure.
23 May – Four protesting students (Martins, Miragaia, Dráusio and Camargo) are killed by government troops, sparking off the "Paulista War".
June – Paulista rebels take control of the state of São Paulo.
9 July – Constitutionalist Revolution: The population of the state of São Paulo revolt against the 1930 coup d'état.
July–August – 82 athletes from Brazil travel on board the Itaquicê to Los Angeles for the Summer Olympic Games, selling coffee along the way to fund the trip. The team wins no medals.
2 October – The São Paulo rebels are defeated by government forces.
October – Brazilian Integralism, a Fascist movement, is founded by Plínio Salgado.

Arts and culture

Books 
Afonso Schmidt – Garoa

Films 
Ao Redor do Brasil
Anchieta Entre o Amor e a Religião
O Pecado da Vaidade

Births 
26 January – Kilza Setti, ethnomusicologist, composer, and pianist
19 February – Alberto Dines, journalist and writer (died 2018)
26 April – Agildo Ribeiro, actor and humorist (died 2018)
28 April – Stênio Garcia, actor
6 May – José Maria Marin, politician and sports administrator
12 May – Walter Wanderley, organist and pianist, best known for his lounge and bossa nova music. (died 1986)
25 May – Joaquim Pedro de Andrade, film director and screenwriter (died 1988)
21 June – Ilka Soares, actress
23 July – Oswaldo Loureiro, Brazilian actor (died 2018)
28 July – Carlos Alberto Brilhante Ustra, military officer and politician (died 2015)
28 August – Raul Cortez, actor (died 2006)
15 September – Antônio Abujamra, theatre and television director and actor (died 2015)
14 November – Cláudio Ulpiano, philosopher (died 1999)

Deaths 
2 July – Rodolfo Teófilo, writer, poet and film-maker (born 1863)
23 July – Alberto Santos-Dumont, Franco-Brazilian aviation pioneer (born 1873; apparent suicide by hanging)
date unknown – Evaristo Conrado Engelberg, mechanical engineer and inventor (born 1853)

References

See also 
1932 in Brazilian football
List of Brazilian films of 1932

 
1930s in Brazil
Years of the 20th century in Brazil
Brazil
Brazil